Paalkhi is a Hindi language Indian drama television series which premiered on 13 June 2005 on Zee TV. The series is produced by Prem Krishen of Cinevistaas Limited and starred Karishma Tanna and Abhay Vakil in the main lead.

Plot
The story of Palak, Pranjal and Daksh. Palak is the only daughter of separated parents, is brought up in London and comes to Mumbai to spend some time with her grandmother. She gets admission in Mumbai’s prestigious Princeton College where she meets Pranjal and they fall in love. To fulfill their only daughter’s dream, Palak’s parents decided to engage Palak with Pranjal.  Till Daksh comes by. Daksh is Pranjal’s twin brother who is the back sheep of the family and obsessed with Palak. Daksh tries everything in his capacity to try and woo Palak but to no avail. Which is why grudgingly he gives up, and accepts Palak and Pranjal’s love.

However, with the possibility of love to grow between Daksh and Palak a hard truth is revealed that Pranjal is alive. Not only is Palak's First true love alive he is also planning revenge on the newlyweds as he believes that Palak was unfaithful.

Cast
 Karishma Tanna ... Palak
 Abhay Vakil ... Pranjal/Daksh 
 Pravin Hingoria
 Shalini Kapoor ... Mohini
 Kainaaz Pervees
 Sandeep Mehta
 Rupa Divetia
 Ekta Sharma
 Ahmed Khan
 Nayan Bhatt
 Bhairavi Vaidya
 Nazneen Patel ... Keshvi

References

External links
Official Site on Cinevistaas Limited

2005 Indian television series debuts
2006 Indian television series endings
Indian television soap operas
Zee TV original programming